is a natural satellite of Jupiter. It was discovered by a team of astronomers from the University of Hawaii led by Scott S. Sheppard in 2003.

 is about 2 km in diameter, and orbits Jupiter at an average distance of 23,000,000 km in 669 days, at an inclination of 149° to the ecliptic, in a retrograde direction and with an eccentricity of 0.497.

It belongs to the Pasiphae group, irregular retrograde moons orbiting Jupiter at distances ranging between 22.8 and 24.1 Gm, and with inclinations ranging between 144.5° and 158.3°.

This moon was considered lost until late 2020, when it was recovered by amateur astronomers Kai Ly and Sam Deen in archival images from 2001-2018. The recovery of the moon was announced by the Minor Planet Center on 13 January 2021.

References

Pasiphae group
Moons of Jupiter
Irregular satellites
Astronomical objects discovered in 2003
Moons with a retrograde orbit